"Country State of Mind" is a song by American country music artist Hank Williams Jr. It was co-written by Williams Jr. and Roger Alan Wade, and was released in June 1986 as the first single from the album Montana Cafe.  The song reached number 2 on the Billboard Hot Country Singles & Tracks chart.

Cover versions
The song was covered in 2020 by Josh Turner and Chris Janson for Turner's album of the same name.
Before that Mark Chesnutt covered it for his 2010 album Outlaw.

Chart performance

References

1986 singles
1986 songs
Hank Williams Jr. songs
Mark Chesnutt songs
Josh Turner songs
Chris Janson songs
Songs written by Hank Williams Jr.
Song recordings produced by Barry Beckett
Warner Records singles
Curb Records singles